Kid vs. Kat (stylized KiD vs KaT) is a Canadian animated television series that originally aired on YTV in Canada from October 25, 2008, until June 4, 2011. The series was created and co-directed by Rob Boutilier, developed and produced at Studio B Productions (owned by WildBrain), in association with YTV and Jetix Europe for its first season and Disney XD for its second season. 52 episodes were produced.

Premise
When Coop Burtonburger's younger sister Millie brings home a strange stray cat, his idyllic life shatters as he discovers that the cat is actually a conniving, evil alien mastermind with a fanatical hate for mankind and an unassumingly sinister goal. The two battle daily as Coop tries to warn others of Kat's evil, only to find his evidence destroyed by him and deemed a fool. The series is set in the fictional town of Bootsville, British Columbia, Canada.

Episodes

Voice cast
Erin Mathews as Cooper "Coop" Burtonburger
Kathleen Barr as Kat (Mr. Kat), Millie Burtonburger, Lorne
Trevor Devall as Burt Burtonburger
Cathy Weseluck as Dennis Lawrence Chan
Linda Sorenson as Mrs. Elisabeth Munson
Chiara Zanni as Fiona Munson (S2)
Tabitha St. Germain as Phoebe
Vincent Tong as Henry Chan
Brian Drummond as Harley

Production

Development
The series' pilot was first shown off at MIPCOM Jr. in 2006, and the series was officially revealed under the title Look What My Sister Dragged In in February 2007, where Studio B signed a development deal with YTV for the series. The series' production was started in January 2008. The series is animated in Flash.

On February 12, 2008, after purchasing Studio B Productions, their new owner DHX Media announced they had licensed out the TV, home video, and consumer product rights for the series to Jetix Europe in areas where the company operated Jetix channels, while Disney-ABC International Television would handle TV distribution in these territories. DHX's then-TV distributor Decode Enterprises would handle television, home entertainment, and merchandising and licensing rights for the rest of the world.

On April 15, 2008, the series was pre-sold by Decode to air on Toon Disney's Jetix block in the United States.

On October 19, 2009, DHX announced that the series had been renewed for a second season. By then, the series had been airing on over 10 Disney XD channels around the world. It was also announced that the series had been pre-sold to additional broadcasters including Vrak in Canada, ABC in Australia, Disney XD Latin America, Disney XD India, Disney XD Japan, Cartoon Network South Korea and Nickelodeon Southeast Asia. On August 10, 2010, DHX announced that TV Azteca in Mexico and ECTV in Ecuador had pre-sold the series for free TV in Latin America.

Cancellation
On August 19, 2011, Rob Boutilier announced via Facebook the series wasn't renewed for a third season and he lacked the right to make further episodes.

Telecast and home media
Kid vs. Kat premiered on YTV on October 25, 2008, in Canada. It aired on Saturdays at 8:30 AM as part of YTV's Crunch block (with repeats until mid-2010s). In the U.S., the show first aired on Disney XD on February 21, 2009, at 9:00 AM (with repeats until July 20, 2011). There is no official DVD release. As of 2022, the show is now streaming on Pluto TV.

Reception 
Emily Ashby of Common Sense Media gave the series a 3 out of 5 stating; "Feline's evil schemes are outrageous - but fun for kids".

References

External links
 

2000s Canadian animated television series
2010s Canadian animated television series
2000s Canadian comic science fiction television series
2010s Canadian comic science fiction television series
Canadian children's animated comic science fiction television series
Canadian children's animated science fantasy television series
2008 Canadian television series debuts
2011 Canadian television series endings
Fictional rivalries
Canadian flash animated television series
Animated television series about cats
Animated television series about children
Television series by DHX Media
Television series by Corus Entertainment
Disney XD original programming
Jetix original programming
YTV (Canadian TV channel) original programming
Alien invasions in television
Television shows set in British Columbia
English-language television shows
Television series about extraterrestrial life